John Lee (March 28, 1917 – July 13, 1972) was an American football blocking back who played on season for the Pittsburgh Pirates of the NFL. He was drafted by the Pittsburgh Pirates in the 10th round of the 81st pick of the 1939 NFL Draft. He played college football at Carnegie Mellon University for the Carnegie Mellon Tartans football team.

References

1917 births
1972 deaths
Players of American football from Pennsylvania
Pittsburgh Pirates (football) players
Carnegie Mellon Tartans football players
People from Washington County, Pennsylvania
American football quarterbacks